is a former Japanese football player.

Playing career
Sato was born in Kanagawa Prefecture on August 26, 1981. After graduating from high school, he joined Japan Football League (JFL) club Yokohama FC in 2000. Although he could not play many matches, Yokohama FC won the champions in 2000 season and was promoted to J2 League. He played many matches from 2001. In September 2003, he moved to JFL club Yokogawa Musashino. In 2004, he moved to JFL club Thespa Kusatsu. He became a regular player and Thespa was promoted to J2 end of 2004 season. Although he played many matches until 2006, his opportunity to play decreased in 2007 and he retired end of 2007 season.

Club statistics

References

External links

library.footballjapan.jp

1981 births
Living people
Association football people from Kanagawa Prefecture
Japanese footballers
J2 League players
Japan Football League players
Yokohama FC players
Tokyo Musashino United FC players
Thespakusatsu Gunma players
Association football forwards